The Sebkha Sidi El Hani is a salt lake in the Sousse Governorate of Tunisia,  southwest of the city of Sousse and  southeast of the city of Kairouan. It covers an area of 36,000 hectares and consists of three depressions: the Sidi El Hani sebkha stricto sensu, the Sebkha Souassi and the Sekha Dkhila. Fueled by several wadis, such as the Wadi Chrita, the Wadi Mansoura and the Wadi Oum El Mellah, it retains water all year round only occasionally.

References

Lakes of Tunisia
Ramsar sites in Tunisia
Sousse Governorate